The Haunted House (known from 2003-2022 as Duel - The Haunted House Strikes Back!) was a dark ride at the Alton Towers theme park near the village of Alton in Staffordshire, opening in 1992. In 2003 it received a new overlay as Duel with the addition of interactive shooting. There was a minimum height restriction of 1.1 metres for younger riders unless accompanied by an adult.

The ride closed in 2022 to reopen as The Curse at Alton Manor.

History
The Haunted House was designed by The Sparks Group and John Wardley and was the largest haunted attraction in Europe at the time of opening. The bespoke ride transit system was built by MACK Rides and designed to allow a high throughput whilst leaving the cars to travel the ride separately, and at varying speeds in different areas. Opening in March 1992, The Haunted House gained much publicity and remained one of Alton Towers' major rides for many years.

Duel – The Haunted House Strikes Back! 
By 2002, many of the original scenes had been altered by the park on an ad-hoc basis. The park decided to add laser guns and revamp the attraction. Towards the end of the 2002 season, a poster was placed outside advertising the new name and opening date, announcing: "Whatever you do, don't miss! Duel - The Haunted House Strikes Back!".

A new soundtrack by David Buckley played on a loop throughout the ride, replacing the original eight zoned tracks. Changes to the ride included replacing many characters with zombies. The revamped ride reopened at the start of the 2003 season.

After an initial teaser, Duel closed on 6 September 2022. The new attraction was announced as The Curse at Alton Manor the following January.

Scarefest 
For the 2008 and 2009 Halloween 'Scarefest' event, the ride opened as "Duel: Live!" featuring several live actors around the ride. Guests waited at the door, before being let in by a maid or a butler. Inside, the laser guns and targets were switched off and the music replaced with a more haunting soundtrack. In 2008, Duel ran as normal during the morning and afternoon before switching to Duel Live after 3:00PM, but ran all day in 2009. In 2010, the overlay was renamed "Skelvin's Haunted Adventure", themed to the park's Halloween mascot 'Skelvin', and played the Beetlejuice title music.

Ride sequence
Guests queued past gravestones in a wooded area, before entering through the front doors of the house. The interior queue meandered through themed rooms, depicting a darkly-lit Victorian vestibule and drawing room.  These scenes featured a number of illusion, themed aroma and haunting music. The second room was also slanted at an angle to disorientate guests. Many of the effects in this room were removed or altered in the Duel revamp, including the optical moving-eye portraits, to be replaced by TV screens playing a backstory & instructional video.

In the station, riders boarded a vehicle. Once beyond the platform, the vehicles accelerated away from one another to take riders into the scenes individually. The first scene took riders past cracking stone walls that appeared possessed. This led to the Grand Hall, where a stone bust jumps out at riders (added in 2003). The hallway looked seemingly empty, before suddenly a large demon appeared overhead between two columns. This effect was originally achieved with a parallel mirror illusion and timed lighting. The car swerved right into a dark corner, where the demon re-appeared offering a teacup (later changed to holding a knife and giant rat). The music transitions into the ride speaker version which is more dramatic.

The car traveled into a stone chamber and towards large skull-shaped effigy into skull's mouth. Inside, a large rotating trommel gave riders the sensation of turning upside-down. In 2003, a screaming zombie was added before entering the tunnel, as well as the splitting head (originally from the finale) at its end.

The ride continued into a stone corridor with large Gothic windows either side. This time you can hear the left speaker variant of the Duel theme. Zombies reached out from the windows towards riders (previously large ghouls), before the car passed the largest window with ghosts moving behind the glass. Originally this scene featured giant hands reaching through the windows and a giant staring face.

The next scene took riders through a chamber where multiple zombies lurch out, before weaving past large spiders. The scene ended with a giant-sized spider suspended overhead. The right speaker version of the tune then gets louder.

Riders then entered a corridor where a skeleton pulls a lever on a fusebox called Electric Bill, turning out the lights. This scene originally featured a large ghost that flew overhead down the corridor. This was removed after its first year and replaced by a new scene featuring skeletons in 1993. Most of this scene was since defunct; it has remained this way since, other than a witch added in 2003.

The car then turned through a series of tight bends in the dark, as screaming heads fly overhead using a UV-strobe effect.

Riders then to traveled into a garden at night, at which point the car slowed down. A crashed hearse could be seen ahead, with an undertaker gesturing to come closer and a ghost flying out of an open coffin (using a Pepper's Ghost illusion). Further into the garden, a troll-like ghoul leapt out from rocks on the right. A statue of Death stood at the end of the garden. Behind an archway, a stone column suddenly turned to reveal a tall, thin demon before the cars accelerated onwards.

Originally the finale scene traveled further into the garden, where riders traveled through a possessed rocky swamp as serpentine creatures and ghouls appeared. In 2003, this was replaced by an industrial basement where zombies appeared from barrels, windows and overhead walkways.

References

External links

Haunted attractions (simulated)
Dark rides
Amusement rides introduced in 2003
Buildings and structures completed in 1992
Animatronic attractions
Alton Towers
Amusement rides manufactured by Mack Rides
2003 establishments in the United Kingdom